Ustevatn is a lake in the municipality of Hol in Viken county, Norway. The main inflow is on the west side of the lake provided by Ustekveikja, which originates from the area around Finse in Hordaland.  Norwegian National Road 7 runs along  the north side of the lake.   Bergen line railway has stations at Ustaoset and Haugastøl.

See also
List of lakes in Norway

References

Lakes of Viken (county)